Padauk Yake Wal is a 1963 Burmese black-and-white drama film, directed by U Tin Yu starring Win Oo, Tin Tin Aye and Hnin Si.

Cast
Win Oo
Tin Tin Aye
Hnin Si

References

1963 films
1960s Burmese-language films
Burmese drama films
Films shot in Myanmar
1963 drama films